Hemen is a falcon god in the Ancient Egyptian religion

Places of worship
Often worshipped as a divine entity unified with Horus, as Horus-Hemen lord of Asphynis or Horakhte-Hemen of Hefat. Flinders Petrie refers to Hemen as a god of Tuphium. Hemen is also used for the name of a town of ancient Egypt (as mentioned by Flinders Petrie during his studies of Abydos).

Some examples of artifacts containing references to Hemen
Hemen is mentioned in a limited number of inscriptions and texts. Some of these include:
 In the Pyramid Texts, Utterance 231.
 Ankhtifi, a nomarch (= provincial governor) dated to the First Intermediate Period, is shown inspecting a fleet, killing a hippopotamus in Hefat during festivities and offering the hippopotamus to Hemen.
 A round-topped stela from the 13th dynasty invokes Ptah-Sokari-Osiris and Horus-Hemen lord of Asphynis. The stela was formerly in the V. Golenishchev collection, but is now in Moscow, in the State Pushkin Museum of Fine Arts.
 The chief sculptor Userhat who lived at the end of the 18th dynasty/beginning 19th dynasty mentions "causing cult statues to rest in their shrine". Hemen of Hefat is one of the gods listed among those Userhat was responsible for.
 Statue from the time of Amenhotep III; Now in Avignon, Musée Calvet.
 In the 22nd dynasty Hemen of Hefat is mentioned as an oracle. A man named Ikeni appears before Hemen in Hefat and the god says "Ikeni is right! He paid (etc.)".
 The 25th dynasty pharaoh Taharqa is shown before the god Hemen in a statue which is now in the Louvre.
 In ca. 300 BC Hemen's cult is still active as attested by an inscription of an official named Hornefer.
 In the Griffiths Institute listing: A stone object with Hemen possibly hawk-headed showing text of Amenophis III ‘beloved of Hemen lord of the sed-festival’.

See also
Sed festival

References

Further reading
 "Crime, Cult and Capital Punishment (Mo'alla Inscription 8)" by H. Willems, The Journal of Egyptian Archaeology Vol. 76, (1990), pp. 27–54, Retrieved 11 April 2015, 

Egyptian gods
Falcon deities
Animal gods